The 2002 season was the Green Bay Packers' 82nd in the National Football League (NFL) and their 84th overall.

For the first time since 1989, LeRoy Butler was not on the opening day roster.

This was the first of three consecutive NFC North titles for the Packers. They achieved a 12–4 record in the regular season, before losing in the NFC Wild Card playoffs round to quarterback Brett Favre's former team, the Atlanta Falcons, at Lambeau Field. This marked the first time in NFL history that the Packers had lost at home in the playoffs.

Background
In 2001, the Packers achieved the franchise's best record since 1997, finishing 12–4 and advancing to the divisional round of the playoffs. There, they lost to the eventual NFC champion St. Louis Rams. During the game, it became clear that the Packers would need wide receivers with greater speed and ability to compete with the conference's best teams. GM Mike Sherman spent the 2002 offseason revamping Green Bay's receiving corps. The team promoted Donald Driver to starter, acquired veteran Terry Glenn from the New England Patriots and drafted Javon Walker in the first round of the 2002 NFL Draft. The influx of new players seemed to position the Packers as one of the strongest contenders in the NFC.

Season summary
Green Bay started the season with eight wins in their first nine games, led by quarterback Brett Favre and running back Ahman Green. The Packers led the NFC North throughout the year, winning the division by a six-game margin. Green Bay became the first team to win the newly rechristened division, formerly known as the NFC Central. It was the Packers' first division title since 1997, and the team would go on to win the NFC North for three consecutive seasons.

For the first time in years, it appeared that the Packers had a legitimate chance of reaching the Super Bowl heading into the final Sunday of the regular season. With one game left, Green Bay was 12–3, and a victory away from clinching home field advantage throughout the playoffs after the Philadelphia Eagles failed to clinch home field advantage themselves one day prior in an overtime defeat to the New York Giants. The Packers had never lost a home playoff game in franchise history, had achieved an 8–0 record at home in 2002, and had established a run of Lambeau Field dominance since the Mike Holmgren era. As a result, playing home games at Lambeau Field would seemingly give the Packers a significant advantage in the playoffs. The final game was on the road against the New York Jets, who beat the Packers handily to win the AFC East division title. The loss which coincided with the Buccaneers winning was a blow to the Packers, who dropped down to the number three seed in the NFC and had an incredibly difficult road to the Super Bowl. Six days later, the Packers were beaten by Michael Vick's Atlanta Falcons, the first home playoff loss in Packers history.

The 2002 season was another memorable year for quarterback Brett Favre. Throughout the season, Favre was a favorite to win his fourth Most Valuable Player award. The Packers' lopsided loss to the Jets in the regular season finale may have swayed voters, as Favre lost the MVP award by merely two votes to Raiders quarterback Rich Gannon.

Offseason

2002 NFL draft
In the 2002 NFL draft, the Packers selected 20th overall, drafting future all-pro wide receiver Javon Walker with their first round pick.

 Players highlighted in yellow indicate players selected to the Pro Bowl during their NFL career.

Undrafted free agents

Personnel

Staff

Roster

Preseason

Regular season

Schedule
The Packers finished 12–4 overall, winning the NFC North crown by a six-game margin.

Game summaries

Week 1: vs. Atlanta Falcons

Week 2: at New Orleans Saints

Week 3: at Detroit Lions

Week 4: vs. Carolina Panthers

Week 5: at Chicago Bears

Week 6: at New England Patriots

Week 7: vs. Washington Redskins

Week 9: vs. Miami Dolphins

Week 10: vs. Detroit Lions

Week 11: at Minnesota Vikings

Week 12: at Tampa Bay Buccaneers

Week 13: vs. Chicago Bears

Week 14: vs. Minnesota Vikings

Week 15: at San Francisco 49ers

Week 16: vs. Buffalo Bills

Week 17: at New York Jets

Standings

Playoffs

Schedule

Game summaries

NFC Wild Card: vs. Atlanta Falcons

Awards and records
 Brett Favre, NFC Leader, Attempts (551) 
 Brett Favre, NFC Leader, Completions (341)
 Brett Favre, NFC Leader(tied), Touchdown Passes (27)

References

Green Bay Packers seasons
Green Bay Packers
NFC North championship seasons
Green